A diagnosis of exclusion or by exclusion (per exclusionem) is a diagnosis of a medical condition reached by a process of elimination, which may be necessary if presence cannot be established with complete confidence from history, examination or testing. Such elimination of other reasonable possibilities is a major component in performing a differential diagnosis.

Diagnosis by exclusion tends to occur where scientific knowledge is scarce, specifically where the means to verify a diagnosis by an objective method is absent. As a specific diagnosis cannot be confirmed, a fall back position is to exclude that group of known causes that may cause a similar clinical presentation.

The largest category of diagnosis by exclusion is seen among psychiatric disorders where the presence of physical or organic disease must be excluded as a prerequisite for making a functional diagnosis.

Examples
An example of such a diagnosis is "fever of unknown origin": to explain the cause of elevated temperature the most common causes of unexplained fever (infection, neoplasm, or collagen vascular disease) must be ruled out.

Other examples include:
 Adult-onset Still's disease
 Behçet's disease
 Bell's palsy
 Burning mouth syndrome
 Chronic recurrent multifocal osteomyelitis
 Long COVID
 Psychogenic polydipsia
 Schizophrenia
 Somatic symptom disorder
 Sudden infant death syndrome
 Tolosa–Hunt syndrome

See also 
 Idiopathic

References 

Medical terminology